Thomas Potter Smith (July 1901 – 1 September 1978) was an English professional footballer who made nearly 400 appearances in the Football League playing as an inside left or left half for Merthyr Town (two spells), Hull City, Hartlepools United, Cardiff City and Brighton & Hove Albion, where he spent the majority of his career.

Life and career
Smith was born in Newcastle upon Tyne. He played local football for St Peter's Albion before beginning a tour of the Football League. After single seasons with Merthyr Town, Hull City, Hartlepools United and Merthyr Town again, before joining Cardiff City in 1929, where he spent three seasons disrupted by injury. In 1929, he signed for Brighton & Hove Albion, where he established himself as a first-team regular, averaging 40 league matches a season over an eight-year spell. After a season with Crystal Palace without a league appearance, he moved into non-league football with Gloucester City, where he acted as player-coach. Smith died in Brighton in 1978 at the age of 77.

References

1901 births
1977 deaths
Footballers from Newcastle upon Tyne
English footballers
Association football inside forwards
Association football wing halves
Merthyr Town F.C. players
Hull City A.F.C. players
Cardiff City F.C. players
Hartlepool United F.C. players
Brighton & Hove Albion F.C. players
Crystal Palace F.C. players
Gloucester City A.F.C. players
English Football League players